Henri de Valois, duc d'Angoulême (1551  – 2 June 1586, in Aix-en-Provence), sometimes called "Henri, bâtard de Valois" or "Henri de France", was a Légitimé de France, cleric, and military commander during the Wars of Religion.

Biography 
Henri was born the bastard son of Henri II of France and his mistress Janet Stewart, an illegitimate daughter of James IV of Scotland. Being the most highly favored natural son of the King, he was legitimized and made Duke of Angoulême. Henri would later serve as Abbot of La Chaise-Dieu, Grand Prior of France of the Sovereign Order of Malta  and Admiral of the Levantine Sea, further ruling as Governor of Provence from 1579 until his death in 1586.

In 1570, Henri was chosen, by the supporters of Mary, Queen of Scots, as a potential leader of a French military force to aid them in their civil war against the supporters James VI of Scotland. They thought that Henri's Scottish and French royal ancestry would gain him respect in Scotland and England. Although the Queen's supporters put the idea to John Lesley, Queen Mary's ambassador in France, French soldiers and Henri were not sent to Scotland.

Henri d'Angoulême took a major role in the two extended military battle against Huguenot strongholds during the height of the French Wars of Religion, engaging in the massive Siege of La Rochelle (1572–1573), organized by the Duke of Anjou, future Henry III of France, and leading the five-year Siege of Ménerbes (1573–1578), fought at a citadel in the Luberon foothills cherished by Pope Pius V.

While serving as Governor of Provence, his secretary was the poet François de Malherbe. Henri wrote many sonnets, one of which was set to music by Fabrice Caietain.

In 1586, Henri was killed at Aix-en-Provence in a duel with Philip Altoviti, who also was mortally wounded in the fight.

Ancestry

References

Sources

1551 births
1586 deaths
16th-century French people
Henri d'Angoulême
Duelling fatalities
French people of Scottish descent
French soldiers
Governors of Provence
Henri
Illegitimate children of French monarchs
Sonneteers
16th-century French politicians
16th-century French military personnel
Sons of kings